Hoplostethus confinis is a species of slimehead native to the Andaman Sea in the Indian Ocean. It lives in deep water between 290m and 330m from the surface and can reach sizes of up to 12.3 cm.

References

External links
 

confinis
Fish described in 1980
Fish of the Indian Ocean